This page lists all described species of the spider family Araneidae as of Dec. 21, 2016, that start with letters N through Z.

Nemoscolus
Nemoscolus Simon, 1895
 Nemoscolus affinis Lessert, 1933 — Congo
 Nemoscolus caudifer Strand, 1906 — West Africa
 Nemoscolus cotti Lessert, 1933 — Mozambique
 Nemoscolus elongatus Lawrence, 1947 — South Africa
 Nemoscolus kolosvaryi Caporiacco, 1947 — Uganda
 Nemoscolus lateplagiatis Simon, 1907 — Guinea-Bissau
 Nemoscolus laurae (Simon, 1868) (type species) — Western Mediterranean
 Nemoscolus niger Caporiacco, 1936 — Libya
 Nemoscolus obscurus Simon, 1897 — South Africa
 Nemoscolus rectifrons Roewer, 1961 — Senegal
 Nemoscolus semilugens Denis, 1966 — Libya
 Nemoscolus tubicola (Simon, 1887) — South Africa
 Nemoscolus turricola Berland, 1933 — Mali
 Nemoscolus vigintipunctatus Simon, 1897 — South Africa
 Nemoscolus waterloti Berland, 1920 — Madagascar

Nemosinga
Nemosinga Caporiacco, 1947
 Nemosinga atra Caporiacco, 1947 (type species) — Tanzania
 Nemosinga atra bimaculata Caporiacco, 1947 — Tanzania
 Nemosinga strandi Caporiacco, 1947 — Tanzania

Nemospiza
Nemospiza Simon, 1903
 Nemospiza conspicillata Simon, 1903 — South Africa

Neogea
Neogea Levi, 1983
 Neogea egregia (Kulczynski, 1911) (type species) — New Guinea
 Neogea nocticolor (Thorell, 1887) — India to Sumatra
 Neogea yunnanensis Yin et al., 1990 — China

Neoscona
Neoscona Simon, 1864
 Neoscona achine (Simon, 1906) — India, China
 Neoscona adianta (Walckenaer, 1802) — Palearctic
 Neoscona adianta persecta (Schenkel, 1936) — China
 Neoscona alberti (Strand, 1913) — Central, Southern Africa
 Neoscona albertoi Barrion-Dupo, 2008 — Philippines
 Neoscona aldinei Barrion-Dupo, 2008 — Philippines
 Neoscona amamiensis Tanikawa, 1998 — Japan
 Neoscona ampoyae Barrion-Dupo, 2008 — Philippines
 Neoscona angulatula (Schenkel, 1937) — Madagascar, Aldabra, Kenya
 Neoscona arabesca (Walckenaer, 1841) (type species) — North, Central America, West Indies
 Neoscona bengalensis Tikader & Bal, 1981 — India, Pakistan
 Neoscona bihumpi Patel, 1988 — India
 Neoscona biswasi Bhandari & Gajbe, 2001 — India
 Neoscona blondeli (Simon, 1886) — Africa
 Neoscona bomdilaensis Biswas & Biswas, 2006 — India
 Neoscona bucheti (Lessert, 1930) — Congo
 Neoscona bucheti avakubiensis (Lessert, 1930) — Congo
 Neoscona bucheti flexuosa (Lessert, 1930) — Congo, Yemen
 Neoscona byzanthina (Pavesi, 1876) — France, Turkey
 Neoscona cereolella (Strand, 1907) — Congo, East Africa, Madagascar
 Neoscona cereolella setaceola (Strand, 1913) — Central Africa
 Neoscona cheesmanae (Berland, 1938) — New Hebrides
 Neoscona chiarinii (Pavesi, 1883) — West, Central, East Africa
 Neoscona chongzuoensis Zhang & Zhang, 2011 — China
 Neoscona chrysanthusi Tikader & Bal, 1981 — Bhutan, India, Pakistan
 Neoscona crucifera (Lucas, 1838) — North America, Canary Islands, Madeira, Hawaii
 Neoscona dhruvai Patel & Nigam, 1994 — India
 Neoscona dhumani Patel & Reddy, 1993 — India
 Neoscona domiciliorum (Hentz, 1847) — USA
 Neoscona dostinikea Barrion & Litsinger, 1995 — Philippines
 Neoscona dyali Gajbe, 2004 — India
 Neoscona facundoi Barrion-Dupo, 2008 — Philippines
 Neoscona flavescens Zhang & Zhang, 2011 — China
 Neoscona goliath (Benoit, 1963) — Ivory Coast
 Neoscona govindai Biswas & Raychaudhuri, 2013 - Bangladesh 
 Neoscona hirta (C. L. Koch, 1844) — Central, Southern Africa
 Neoscona holmi (Schenkel, 1953) — China, Korea
 Neoscona huzaifi Mukhtar, 2012 — Pakistan
 Neoscona jinghongensis Yin et al., 1990 — China
 Neoscona kabiri Biswas & Raychaudhuri, 2013 - Bangladesh 
 Neoscona kisangani Grasshoff, 1986 — Congo
 Neoscona kivuensis Grasshoff, 1986 — Congo
 Neoscona kunmingensis Yin et al., 1990 — China
 Neoscona lactea (Saito, 1933) — Taiwan
 Neoscona leucaspis (Schenkel, 1963) — China
 Neoscona lipana Barrion-Dupo, 2008 — Philippines
 Neoscona lotan Levy, 2007 — Israel
 Neoscona maculaticeps (L. Koch, 1871) — Japan, Samoa
 Neoscona marcanoi Levi, 1993 — Cuba, Hispaniola
 Neoscona mellotteei (Simon, 1895) — China, Korea, Taiwan, Japan
 Neoscona menghaiensis Yin et al., 1990 — China
 Neoscona molemensis Tikader & Bal, 1981 — Bangladesh, India to Philippines, Indonesia
 Neoscona moreli (Vinson, 1863) — Cuba to Argentina, Africa to Seychelles
 Neoscona mukerjei Tikader, 1980 — India, Pakistan
 Neoscona multiplicans (Chamberlin, 1924) — China, Korea, Japan
 Neoscona murthyi Patel & Reddy, 1990 — India
 Neoscona nasidae Biswas & Raychaudhuri, 2013 - Bangladesh 
 Neoscona nautica (L. Koch, 1875) — Cosmotropical
 Neoscona novella (Simon, 1907) — Bioko
 Neoscona oaxacensis (Keyserling, 1864) — USA to Peru, Galapagos Islands
 Neoscona odites (Simon, 1906) — India
 Neoscona oriemindoroana Barrion & Litsinger, 1995 — Philippines
 Neoscona orientalis (Urquhart, 1887) — New Zealand
 Neoscona orizabensis F. O. P.-Cambridge, 1904 — Mexico
 Neoscona parambikulamensis Patel, 2003 — India
 Neoscona pavida (Simon, 1906) — India, Pakistan, China
 Neoscona penicillipes (Karsch, 1879) — West, Central Africa
 Neoscona platnicki Gajbe & Gajbe, 2001 — India
 Neoscona plebeja (L. Koch, 1871) — Fiji, Tonga, Funafuti, Rapa
 Neoscona polyspinipes Yin et al., 1990 — China
 Neoscona pratensis (Hentz, 1847) — USA, Canada
 Neoscona pseudonautica Yin et al., 1990 — China, Korea
 Neoscona pseudoscylla (Schenkel, 1953) — China
 Neoscona punctigera (Doleschall, 1857) — Reunion to Japan
 Neoscona quadrigibbosa Grasshoff, 1986 — Central, Southern Africa
 Neoscona quincasea Roberts, 1983 — Central, Southern Africa, Aldabra
 Neoscona rahamani Biswas & Raychaudhuri, 2013 - Bangladesh 
 Neoscona rapta (Thorell, 1899) — Africa
 Neoscona raydakensis Saha et al., 1995 — India
 Neoscona rufipalpis (Lucas, 1858) — Africa, St. Helena, Cape Verde Islands, Yemen
 Neoscona rufipalpis buettnerana (Strand, 1908) — Cameroon, Togo
 Neoscona sanghi Gajbe, 2004 — India
 Neoscona sanjivani Gajbe, 2004 — India
 Neoscona scylla (Karsch, 1879) — Russia, China, Korea, Japan
 Neoscona scylloides (Bösenberg & Strand, 1906) — China, Korea, Taiwan, Japan
 Neoscona semilunaris (Karsch, 1879) — China, Korea, Japan
 Neoscona shillongensis Tikader & Bal, 1981 — India, Pakistan, China
 Neoscona simoni Grasshoff, 1986 — Central Africa
 Neoscona sinhagadensis (Tikader, 1975) — India, Pakistan, China
 Neoscona sodom Levy, 1998 — Israel
 Neoscona stanleyi (Lessert, 1930) — Congo
 Neoscona subfusca (C. L. Koch, 1837) — Old World
 Neoscona subfusca alboplagiata Caporiacco, 1947 — Tanzania
 Neoscona subfusca pallidior (Thorell, 1899) — Bioko
 Neoscona subpullata (Bösenberg & Strand, 1906) — China, Korea, Japan
 Neoscona tedgenica (Bakhvalov, 1978) — Central Asia
 Neoscona theisi (Walckenaer, 1841) — India, China to Pacific Islands
 Neoscona theisi carbonaria (Simon, 1909) — Vietnam
 Neoscona theisi feisiana (Strand, 1911) — Caroline Islands
 Neoscona theisi savesi (Simon, 1880) — New Caledonia
 Neoscona theisi theisiella (Tullgren, 1910) — West, Central, East Africa, Yemen
 Neoscona theisi triangulifera (Thorell, 1878) — New Guinea
 Neoscona tianmenensis Yin et al., 1990 — China, Korea
 Neoscona triangula (Keyserling, 1864) — Cape Verde to India
 Neoscona triangula mensamontella (Strand, 1907) — Madagascar
 Neoscona triramusa Yin & Zhao, 1994 — China
 Neoscona ujavalai Reddy & Patel, 1992 — India
 Neoscona usbonga Barrion & Litsinger, 1995 — Philippines
 Neoscona utahana (Chamberlin, 1919) — USA, Mexico
 Neoscona vigilans (Blackwall, 1865) — Africa to Philippines, New Guinea
 Neoscona xiquanensis Barrion, Barrion-Dupo & Heong, 2013 - China 
 Neoscona xishanensis Yin et al., 1990 — China
 Neoscona yadongensis Yin et al., 1990 — China
 Neoscona yptinika Barrion & Litsinger, 1995 — India, Philippines
 Neoscona zhui Zhang & Zhang, 2011 — China

Nephila
Nephila Leach, 1815
 Nephila antipodiana (Walckenaer, 1841) — China, Philippines to New Guinea, Solomon Islands, Queensland
 Nephila clavata L. Koch, 1878 — India to Japan
 Nephila clavata caerulescens Ono, 2011 — Japan
 Nephila clavipes (Linnaeus, 1767) — USA to Argentina, São Tomé
 Nephila clavipes fasciculata (De Geer, 1778) — USA to Argentina
 Nephila clavipes vespucea (Walckenaer, 1841) — Argentina
 Nephila comorana Strand, 1916 — Comoro Islands
 Nephila constricta Karsch, 1879 — Tropical Africa
 Nephila cornuta (Pallas, 1772) — Guyana
 Nephila dirangensis Biswas & Biswas, 2006 — India
 Nephila edulis (Labillardière, 1799) — Australia, New Guinea, New Caledonia, New Zealand
 Nephila fenestrata Thorell, 1859 — South Africa
 Nephila fenestrata fuelleborni Dahl, 1912 — East Africa
 Nephila fenestrata venusta (Blackwall, 1865) — West, Central Africa
 Nephila inaurata (Walckenaer, 1841) — Mauritius, Rodriguez, Réunion
 Nephila inaurata madagascariensis (Vinson, 1863) — South Africa to Seychelles
 Nephila komaci Kuntner & Coddington, 2009 — South Africa, Madagascar
 Nephila kuhlii (Doleschall, 1859) — India to Sulawesi
 Nephila laurinae Thorell, 1881 — China to Solomon Islands
 Nephila pakistaniensis Ghafoor & Beg, 2002 — Pakistan
 Nephila pilipes (Fabricius, 1793) — India to China, Philippines, northeastern Australia
 Nephila pilipes malagassa (Strand, 1907) — Madagascar
 Nephila plumipes (Latreille, 1804) — Indonesia, New Guinea, Australia, New Caledonia, Vanuatu, Solomon Islands, New Ireland
 Nephila robusta Tikader, 1962 — India
 Nephila senegalensis (Walckenaer, 1841) — West Africa to Ethiopia
 Nephila senegalensis annulata (Thorell, 1859) — Namibia, South Africa
 Nephila senegalensis bragantina Brito Capello, 1867 — Central Africa
 Nephila senegalensis hildebrandti Dahl, 1912 — Madagascar
 Nephila senegalensis huebneri Dahl, 1912 — East Africa
 Nephila senegalensis keyserlingi (Blackwall, 1865) — Congo, East Africa
 Nephila senegalensis nyikae Pocock, 1898 — East Africa
 Nephila senegalensis schweinfurthi Simon, 1890 — Yemen
 Nephila sexpunctata Giebel, 1867 — Brazil, Paraguay, Argentina
 Nephila sumptuosa Gerstäcker, 1873 — East Africa, Socotra
 Nephila tetragnathoides (Walckenaer, 1841) — Fiji, Tonga, Niue
 Nephila turneri Blackwall, 1833 — West, Central Africa
 Nephila turneri orientalis Benoit, 1964 — Central, East Africa
 Nephila vitiana (Walckenaer, 1847) — Indonesia, Sulawesi, to Fiji, Tonga

Nephilengys
Nephilengys L. Koch, 1872
 Nephilengys malabarensis (Walckenaer, 1841) — India to China, Philippines, Japan, Ambon
 Nephilengys papuana Thorell, 1881 — New Guinea, Queensland

Nephilingis
Nephilingis Kuntner, 2013
 Nephilingis borbonica (Vinson, 1863) — Réunion
 Nephilingis cruentata (Fabricius, 1775) — Tropical Africa, South America
 Nephilingis dodo (Kuntner & Agnarsson, 2011) — Mauritius
 Nephilingis livida (Vinson, 1863) — Madagascar, Comoro Islands, Aldabra, Seychelles

Nicolepeira
Nicolepeira Levi, 2001
 Nicolepeira bicaudata (Nicolet, 1849) — Chile
 Nicolepeira flavifrons (Nicolet, 1849) (type species) — Chile
 Nicolepeira transversalis (Nicolet, 1849) — Chile

Novakiella
Novakiella Court & Forster, 1993
 Novakiella trituberculosa (Roewer, 1942) — Australia, New Zealand

Novaranea
Novaranea Court & Forster, 1988
 Novaranea courti Framenau, 2011 — New South Wales, Victoria, Tasmania
 Novaranea queribunda (Keyserling, 1887) (type species) — New Zealand

Nuctenea
Nuctenea Simon, 1864
 Nuctenea cedrorum (Simon, 1929) — Algeria
 Nuctenea silvicultrix (C. L. Koch, 1835) — Palearctic
 Nuctenea umbratica (Clerck, 1757) (type species) — Europe to Azerbaijan

Oarces 
Oarces Simon, 1879
 Oarces ornatus Mello-Leitão, 1935 -  Brazil 
 Oarces reticulatus (Nicolet, 1849) (type species) - Chile, Argentina

Ocrepeira 
Ocrepeira Marx, 1883
 Ocrepeira abiseo Levi, 1993 — Peru
 Ocrepeira albopunctata (Taczanowski, 1879) — Peru, Brazil, Guyana, French Guiana
 Ocrepeira anta Levi, 1993 — Colombia
 Ocrepeira aragua Levi, 1993 — Venezuela
 Ocrepeira arturi Levi, 1993 — Panama
 Ocrepeira atuncela Levi, 1993 — Colombia
 Ocrepeira barbara Levi, 1993 — Peru
 Ocrepeira bispinosa (Mello-Leitao, 1945) — Brazil
 Ocrepeira branta Levi, 1993 — Jamaica
 Ocrepeira camaca Levi, 1993 — Brazil
 Ocrepeira comaina Levi, 1993 — Peru
 Ocrepeira covillei Levi, 1993 — Costa Rica, Trinidad to Bolivia
 Ocrepeira cuy Levi, 1993 — Peru
 Ocrepeira darlingtoni (Bryant, 1945) — Hispaniola
 Ocrepeira duocypha (Chamberlin, 1916) — Peru
 Ocrepeira ectypa (Walckenaer, 1841) (type species) — USA
 Ocrepeira fiebrigi (Dahl, 1906) — Brazil, Paraguay
 Ocrepeira galianoae Levi, 1993 — Brazil, Argentina
 Ocrepeira georgia (Levi, 1976) — USA
 Ocrepeira gima Levi, 1993 — Brazil
 Ocrepeira globosa (F. O. P.-Cambridge, 1904) — USA, Mexico
 Ocrepeira gnomo (Mello-Leitao, 1943) — Brazil
 Ocrepeira gulielmi Levi, 1993 — Colombia, Ecuador
 Ocrepeira heredia Levi, 1993 — Costa Rica
 Ocrepeira herrera Levi, 1993 — Colombia, Ecuador, Peru
 Ocrepeira hirsuta (Mello-Leitao, 1942) — Brazil, Paraguay, Argentina
 Ocrepeira hondura Levi, 1993 — Costa Rica
 Ocrepeira incerta (Bryant, 1936) — Cuba
 Ocrepeira ituango Levi, 1993 — Colombia
 Ocrepeira jacara Levi, 1993 — Brazil
 Ocrepeira jamora Levi, 1993 — Ecuador
 Ocrepeira klossi Levi, 1993 — Brazil
 Ocrepeira lapeza Levi, 1993 — Colombia
 Ocrepeira lisei Levi, 1993 — Brazil
 Ocrepeira lurida (Mello-Leitao, 1943) — Bolivia, Argentina
 Ocrepeira macaiba Levi, 1993 — Brazil
 Ocrepeira macintyrei Levi, 1993 — Ecuador
 Ocrepeira magdalena Levi, 1993 — Colombia
 Ocrepeira malleri Levi, 1993 — Brazil
 Ocrepeira maltana Levi, 1993 — Peru
 Ocrepeira maraca Levi, 1993 — Colombia, Venezuela, Brazil
 Ocrepeira maroni Dierkens, 2014 - French Guiana 
 Ocrepeira mastophoroides (Mello-Leitao, 1942) — Argentina
 Ocrepeira molle Levi, 1993 — Bolivia, Argentina
 Ocrepeira pedregal Levi, 1993 — Mexico, Nicaragua
 Ocrepeira pinhal Levi, 1993 — Brazil
 Ocrepeira pista Levi, 1993 — Peru
 Ocrepeira planada Levi, 1993 — Colombia, Ecuador
 Ocrepeira potosi Levi, 1993 — Mexico
 Ocrepeira redempta (Gertsch & Mulaik, 1936) — USA to Honduras
 Ocrepeira redondo Levi, 1993 — Colombia
 Ocrepeira rufa (O. P.-Cambridge, 1889) — Mexico to Costa Rica
 Ocrepeira saladito Levi, 1993 — Colombia
 Ocrepeira serrallesi (Bryant, 1947) — West Indies
 Ocrepeira sorota Levi, 1993 — Bolivia
 Ocrepeira steineri Levi, 1993 — Venezuela
 Ocrepeira subrufa (F. O. P.-Cambridge, 1904) — Mexico to Panama
 Ocrepeira tinajillas Levi, 1993 — Colombia, Ecuador
 Ocrepeira tumida (Keyserling, 1865) — Colombia, Ecuador
 Ocrepeira tungurahua Levi, 1993 — Ecuador
 Ocrepeira valderramai Levi, 1993 — Colombia
 Ocrepeira venustula (Keyserling, 1879) — Colombia to Chile
 Ocrepeira verecunda (Keyserling, 1865) — Colombia
 Ocrepeira viejo Levi, 1993 — Costa Rica to Peru
 Ocrepeira willisi Levi, 1993 — Panama
 Ocrepeira yaelae Levi, 1993 — Ecuador
 Ocrepeira yucatan Levi, 1993 — Mexico

Ordgarius
Ordgarius Keyserling, 1886
 Ordgarius acanthonotus (Simon, 1909) — Vietnam
 Ordgarius bicolor Pocock, 1899 — New Britain
 Ordgarius clypeatus Simon, 1897 — Amboina
 Ordgarius ephippiatus Thorell, 1898 — Myanmar
 Ordgarius furcatus (O. P.-Cambridge, 1877) — New South Wales
 Ordgarius furcatus distinctus (Rainbow, 1900) — New South Wales
 Ordgarius hexaspinus Saha & Raychaudhuri, 2004 — India
 Ordgarius hobsoni (O. P.-Cambridge, 1877) — India, Sri Lanka, China, Japan
 Ordgarius magnificus (Rainbow, 1897) — Queensland, New South Wales
 Ordgarius monstrosus Keyserling, 1886 (type species) — Queensland
 Ordgarius pustulosus Thorell, 1897 — Java
 Ordgarius sexspinosus (Thorell, 1894) — India to Japan, Indonesia

Paralarinia
Paralarinia Grasshoff, 1970
 Paralarinia agnata Grasshoff, 1970 — Congo
 Paralarinia bartelsi (Lessert, 1933) — South Africa
 Paralarinia denisi (Lessert, 1938) (type species) — Congo
 Paralarinia incerta (Tullgren, 1910) — Central, East Africa

Paraplectana
Paraplectana Brito Capello, 1867
 Paraplectana coccinella (Thorell, 1890) — Myanmar, Nias Islands
 Paraplectana duodecimmaculata Simon, 1897 — Java
 Paraplectana gravelyi (Tikader, 1961) -  India 
 Paraplectana hemisphaerica (C. L. Koch, 1844) — Sierra Leone
 Paraplectana kittenbergeri Caporiacco, 1947 — Tanzania
 Paraplectana multimaculata Thorell, 1899 — Cameroon, East Africa
 Paraplectana rajashree Ahmed et al., 2015 -  India 
 Paraplectana sakaguchii Uyemura, 1938 — China, Japan
 Paraplectana thorntoni (Blackwall, 1865) (type species) — Central Africa, Yemen
 Paraplectana thorntoni occidentalis Strand, 1916 — West, Central Africa
 Paraplectana tsushimensis Yamaguchi, 1960 — China, Taiwan, Japan
 Paraplectana walleri (Blackwall, 1865) — West, Central Africa, Madagascar
 Paraplectana walleri ashantensis Strand, 1907 — Ghana

Paraplectanoides
Paraplectanoides Keyserling, 1886
 Paraplectanoides crassipes Keyserling, 1886 (type species) — Queensland, New South Wales, Tasmania
 Paraplectanoides kochi (O. P.-Cambridge, 1877) — Queensland

Pararaneus
Pararaneus Caporiacco, 1940
 Pararaneus cyrtoscapus (Pocock, 1898) (type species) — Central, East, Southern Africa, Socotra
 Pararaneus perforatus (Thorell, 1899) — Central, East, Southern Africa
 Pararaneus pseudostriatus (Strand, 1908) — Central, East Africa
 Pararaneus spectator (Karsch, 1885) — Africa, Middle East
 Pararaneus uncivulva (Strand, 1907) — Madagascar

Parawixia
Parawixia F. O. P.-Cambridge, 1904
 Parawixia acapulco Levi, 1992 — Mexico
 Parawixia audax (Blackwall, 1863) — Colombia to Argentina
 Parawixia barbacoas Levi, 1992 — Colombia, Ecuador
 Parawixia bistriata (Rengger, 1836) — Brazil, Bolivia, Paraguay, Argentina
 Parawixia casa Levi, 1992 — Colombia
 Parawixia chubut Levi, 2001 — Chile, Argentina
 Parawixia dehaani (Doleschall, 1859) — India to Philippines, New Guinea
 Parawixia dehaani octopunctigera (Strand, 1911) — New Ireland
 Parawixia dehaani pygituberculata (Strand, 1911) — New Ireland, Sulawesi
 Parawixia dehaani quadripunctigera (Strand, 1911) — Aru Islands
 Parawixia destricta (O. P.-Cambridge, 1889) (type species) — Mexico to Panama
 Parawixia divisoria Levi, 1992 — Ecuador, Peru, Brazil, Bolivia
 Parawixia guatemalensis (O. P.-Cambridge, 1889) — Mexico, Guatemala
 Parawixia honesta (O. P.-Cambridge, 1899) — Mexico
 Parawixia hoxaea (O. P.-Cambridge, 1889) — Guatemala to Panama
 Parawixia hypocrita (O. P.-Cambridge, 1889) — Guatemala to Brazil
 Parawixia inopinata Camargo, 1950 — Brazil
 Parawixia kochi (Taczanowski, 1873) — Trinidad to Brazil, Guyana, French Guiana
 Parawixia maldonado Levi, 1992 — Peru
 Parawixia matiapa Levi, 1992 — Trinidad, Colombia, Peru, Brazil
 Parawixia monticola (Keyserling, 1892) — Brazil
 Parawixia nesophila Chamberlin & Ivie, 1936 — Costa Rica, Panama
 Parawixia ouro Levi, 1992 — Peru, Brazil
 Parawixia porvenir Levi, 1992 — Colombia
 Parawixia rigida (O. P.-Cambridge, 1889) — Guatemala to Panama
 Parawixia rimosa (Keyserling, 1892) — Costa Rica to Bolivia
 Parawixia tarapoa Levi, 1992 — Ecuador, Peru, Brazil
 Parawixia tomba Levi, 1992 — Peru, Brazil
 Parawixia tredecimnotata F. O. P.-Cambridge, 1904 — Mexico to Belize, Greater Antilles
 Parawixia undulata (Keyserling, 1892) — Brazil, Uruguay, Argentina
 Parawixia velutina (Taczanowski, 1878) — Colombia to Argentina

Parmatergus
Parmatergus Emerit, 1994
 Parmatergus coccinelloides Emerit, 1994 (type species) — Madagascar
 Parmatergus coccinelloides ambrae Emerit, 1994 — Madagascar
 Parmatergus lens Emerit, 1994 — Madagascar

Pasilobus
Pasilobus Simon, 1895
 Pasilobus antongilensis Emerit, 2000 — Madagascar
 Pasilobus bufoninus (Simon, 1867) (type species) — Taiwan, Java, Moluccas
 Pasilobus capuroni Emerit, 2000 — Madagascar
 Pasilobus conohumeralis (Hasselt, 1894) — Sumatra, Java
 Pasilobus dippenaarae Roff & Haddad, 2015 - South Africa 
 Pasilobus hupingensis Yin, Bao & Kim, 2001 — China, Japan
 Pasilobus insignis O. P.-Cambridge, 1908 — West Africa
 Pasilobus kotigeharus Tikader, 1963 — India
 Pasilobus laevis Lessert, 1930 — Congo
 Pasilobus lunatus Simon, 1897 — Java, Sulawesi
 Pasilobus mammatus Pocock, 1898 — Solomon Islands
 Pasilobus mammosus (Pocock, 1899) — West Africa
 Pasilobus nigrohumeralis (Hasselt, 1882) — Sumatra

Perilla
Perilla Thorell, 1895
 Perilla teres Thorell, 1895 — Myanmar, Vietnam, Malaysia

Pherenice
Pherenice Thorell, 1899
 Pherenice tristis Thorell, 1899 — Cameroon

Phonognatha
Phonognatha Simon, 1894
 Phonognatha graeffei (Keyserling, 1865) (type species) — Australia
 Phonognatha graeffei neocaledonica Berland, 1924 — New Caledonia
 Phonognatha guanga Barrion & Litsinger, 1995 — Philippines
 Phonognatha joannae Berland, 1924 — New Caledonia
 Phonognatha melania (L. Koch, 1871) — Australia, Tasmania
 Phonognatha melanopyga (L. Koch, 1871) — Australia, Tasmania
 Phonognatha pallida (Dalmas, 1917) — Western Australia

Pitharatus
Pitharatus Simon, 1895
 Pitharatus junghuhni (Doleschall, 1859) — Malaysia, Java, Sulawesi

Plebs
Plebs Joseph & Framenau, 2012
 Plebs arleneae Joseph & Framenau, 2012 — Queensland, New South Wales
 Plebs arletteae Joseph & Framenau, 2012 — Lord Howe Island
 Plebs astridae (Strand, 1917) — China, Korea, Taiwan, Japan
 Plebs aurea (Saito, 1934) — Japan
 Plebs baotianmanensis (Hu, Wang & Wang, 1991) — China
 Plebs bradleyi (Keyserling, 1887) — Southeastern Australia, Tasmania
 Plebs cyphoxis (Simon, 1908) — Western Australia, South Australia
 Plebs eburnus (Keyserling, 1886) (type species) — Eastern Australia, Tasmania
 Plebs himalayaensis (Tikader, 1975) — India, possibly China
 Plebs mitratus (Simon, 1895) — India
 Plebs neocaledonicus (Berland, 1924) — New Caledonia
 Plebs oculosus (Zhu & Song, 1994) — China
 Plebs opacus Joseph & Framenau, 2012 — Vanuatu
 Plebs patricius Joseph & Framenau, 2012 — Victoria, Tasmania
 Plebs plumiopedellus (Yin, Wang & Zhang, 1987) — China, Taiwan
 Plebs poecilus (Zhu & Wang, 1994) — China
 Plebs rosemaryae Joseph & Framenau, 2012 — Queensland, Norfolk Islands
 Plebs sachalinensis (Saito, 1934) — Russia, China, Korea, Japan
 Plebs salesi Joseph & Framenau, 2012 — New Guinea
 Plebs sebastiani Joseph & Framenau, 2012 — Philippines
 Plebs tricentrus (Zhu & Song, 1994) — China
 Plebs yanbaruensis (Tanikawa, 2000) — Japan

Poecilarcys
Poecilarcys Simon, 1895
 Poecilarcys ditissimus (Simon, 1885) — Tunisia

Poecilopachys
Poecilopachys Simon, 1895
 Poecilopachys australasia (Griffith & Pidgeon, 1833) (type species) — Queensland, New South Wales, Samoa
 Poecilopachys jenningsi (Rainbow, 1899) — New Hebrides
 Poecilopachys minutissima Chrysanthus, 1971 — New Ireland
 Poecilopachys speciosa (L. Koch, 1872) — Queensland
 Poecilopachys verrucosa (L. Koch, 1871) — New Guinea, Queensland, Samoa

Poltys
Poltys C. L. Koch, 1843
 Poltys acuminatus Thorell, 1898 — Myanmar
 Poltys apiculatus Thorell, 1892 — Singapore
 Poltys baculiger Simon, 1907 — Gabon
 Poltys bhabanii (Tikader, 1970) — India
 Poltys bhavnagarensis Patel, 1988 — India
 Poltys caelatus Simon, 1907 — Sierra Leone, Gabon, Sao Tome
 Poltys columnaris Thorell, 1890 — India, Sri Lanka, Sumatra, Japan
 Poltys corticosus Pocock, 1898 — East Africa
 Poltys dubius (Walckenaer, 1841) — Vietnam
 Poltys elevatus Thorell, 1890 — Sumatra
 Poltys ellipticus Han, Zhang & Zhu, 2010 — China
 Poltys fornicatus Simon, 1907 — Principe
 Poltys frenchi Hogg, 1899 — New Guinea, Moluccas, Queensland
 Poltys furcifer Simon, 1881 — Zanzibar, South Africa
 Poltys godrejii Bastawade & Khandal, 2006 — India
 Poltys grayi Smith, 2006 — Lord Howe Islands
 Poltys hainanensis Han, Zhang & Zhu, 2010 — China
 Poltys horridus Locket, 1980 — Comoro Islands, Seychelles
 Poltys idae (Ausserer, 1871) — Borneo
 Poltys illepidus C. L. Koch, 1843 (type species) — Thailand to Australia, Lord Howe Islands, Norfolk Islands
 Poltys jujorum Smith, 2006 — Queensland
 Poltys kochi Keyserling, 1864 — Mauritius, Madagascar
 Poltys laciniosus Keyserling, 1886 — Australia
 Poltys longitergus Hogg, 1919 — Sumatra
 Poltys milledgei Smith, 2006 — Western Australia, Northern Territory, Bali, Sumbawa
 Poltys monstrosus Simon, 1897 — Sierra Leone
 Poltys mouhoti (Günther, 1862) — Vietnam
 Poltys nagpurensis Tikader, 1982 — India
 Poltys nigrinus Saito, 1933 — Taiwan
 Poltys noblei Smith, 2006 — Queensland, New South Wales, Victoria
 Poltys pannuceus Thorell, 1895 — Myanmar
 Poltys pogonias Thorell, 1891 — Nicobar Islands
 Poltys pygmaeus Han, Zhang & Zhu, 2010 — China
 Poltys raphanus Thorell, 1898 — Myanmar
 Poltys rehmanii Bastawade & Khandal, 2006 — India
 Poltys reuteri Lenz, 1886 — Madagascar
 Poltys squarrosus Thorell, 1898 — Myanmar
 Poltys stygius Thorell, 1898 — Myanmar to Queensland
 Poltys timmeh Smith, 2006 — New Caledonia, Loyalty Islands
 Poltys turriger Simon, 1897 — Vietnam
 Poltys turritus Thorell, 1898 — Myanmar
 Poltys unguifer Simon, 1909 — Vietnam
 Poltys vesicularis Simon, 1889 — Madagascar

Porcataraneus
Porcataraneus Mi & Peng, 2011
 Porcataraneus bengalensis (Tikader, 1975) — India, China
 Porcataraneus cruciatus Mi & Peng, 2011 (type species)— China
 Porcataraneus nanshenensis (Yin et al., 1990) — China

Pozonia
Pozonia Schenkel, 1953
 Pozonia andujari Alayon, 2007 — Hispaniola
 Pozonia bacillifera (Simon, 1897) — Trinidad to Paraguay
 Pozonia balam Estrada-Alvarez, 2015 - Mexico 
 Pozonia dromedaria (O. P.-Cambridge, 1893) — Mexico to Panama
 Pozonia nigroventris (Bryant, 1936) — Mexico to Panama, Cuba, Jamaica

Prasonica
Prasonica Simon, 1895
 Prasonica affinis Strand, 1906 — Algeria
 Prasonica albolimbata Simon, 1895 (type species) — Congo, Madagascar, Yemen
 Prasonica anarillea Roberts, 1983 — Aldabra
 Prasonica hamata Thorell, 1899 — Cameroon
 Prasonica insolens (Simon, 1909) — India, Vietnam, Java
 Prasonica nigrotaeniata (Simon, 1909) — West, Central, East Africa
 Prasonica olivacea Strand, 1906 — Ethiopia
 Prasonica opaciceps (Simon, 1895) — New Guinea
 Prasonica plagiata (Dalmas, 1917) — New Zealand
 Prasonica seriata Simon, 1895 — Africa, Madagascar, Seychelles

Prasonicella
Prasonicella Grasshoff, 1971
 Prasonicella cavipalpis Grasshoff, 1971 (type species) — Madagascar
 Prasonicella marsa Roberts, 1983 — Aldabra

Pronoides
Pronoides Schenkel, 1936
 Pronoides applanatus Mi & Peng, 2013 — China
 Pronoides brunneus Schenkel, 1936 (type species) — Russia, China, Korea, Japan
 Pronoides fusinus Mi & Peng, 2013 — China
 Pronoides guoi Mi & Peng, 2013 — China
 Pronoides sutaiensis Zhang, Zhang & Zhu, 2010 — China
 Pronoides trapezius Mi & Peng, 2013 — China

Pronous
Pronous Keyserling, 1881
 Pronous affinis Simon, 1901 — Malaysia
 Pronous beatus (O. P.-Cambridge, 1893) — Mexico to Costa Rica
 Pronous colon Levi, 1995 — Costa Rica
 Pronous felipe Levi, 1995 — Mexico
 Pronous golfito Levi, 1995 — Costa Rica
 Pronous intus Levi, 1995 — Costa Rica to Brazil
 Pronous lancetilla Levi, 1995 — Honduras
 Pronous nigripes Caporiacco, 1947 — Guyana
 Pronous pance Levi, 1995 — Colombia
 Pronous peje Levi, 1995 — Costa Rica, Panama
 Pronous quintana Levi, 1995 — Mexico
 Pronous shanus Levi, 1995 — Panama
 Pronous tetralobus Simon, 1895 — Madagascar
 Pronous tuberculifer Keyserling, 1881 (type species) — Colombia to Argentina
 Pronous valle Levi, 1995 — Colombia
 Pronous wixoides (Chamberlin & Ivie, 1936) — Panama, Colombia, Ecuador

Pseudartonis
Pseudartonis Simon, 1903
 Pseudartonis flavonigra Caporiacco, 1947 — Ethiopia
 Pseudartonis lobata Simon, 1909 — East Africa
 Pseudartonis occidentalis Simon, 1903 (type species) — Guinea-Bissau, Cameroon
 Pseudartonis semicoccinea Simon, 1907 — Sao Tome

Pseudopsyllo
Pseudopsyllo Strand, 1916
 Pseudopsyllo scutigera Strand, 1916 — Cameroon

Psyllo
Psyllo Thorell, 1899
 Psyllo nitida Thorell, 1899 — Cameroon, Congo

Pycnacantha
Pycnacantha Blackwall, 1865
 Pycnacantha dinteri Meise, 1932 — Namibia
 Pycnacantha echinotes Meise, 1932 — Cameroon
 Pycnacantha fuscosa Simon, 1903 — Madagascar
 Pycnacantha tribulus (Fabricius, 1781) (type species) — Central, South Africa

Rubrepeira
Rubrepeira Levi, 1992
 Rubrepeira rubronigra (Mello-Leitao, 1939) — Mexico to Brazil, Guyana

Scoloderus
Scoloderus Simon, 1887
 Scoloderus ackerlyi Traw, 1996 — Belize
 Scoloderus cordatus (Taczanowski, 1879) (type species) — Mexico to Argentina
 Scoloderus gibber (O. P.-Cambridge, 1898) — Mexico to Argentina
 Scoloderus nigriceps (O. P.-Cambridge, 1895) — USA, Mexico, Bahama Islands, Cuba, Jamaica
 Scoloderus tuberculifer (O. P.-Cambridge, 1889) — USA to Argentina

Sedasta
Sedasta Simon, 1894
 Sedasta ferox Simon, 1894 — West Africa

Singa
Singa C. L. Koch, 1836
 Singa albobivittata Caporiacco, 1947 — Tanzania
 Singa albodorsata Kauri, 1950 — South Africa
 Singa alpigena Yin, Wang & Li, 1983 — China
 Singa alpigenoides Song & Zhu, 1992 — China
 Singa ammophila Levy, 2007 — Israel
 Singa aussereri Thorell, 1873 — Europe
 Singa bifasciata Schenkel, 1936 — China
 Singa chota Tikader, 1970 — India
 Singa concinna Karsch, 1884 — Sao Tome
 Singa cruciformis Yin, Peng & Wang, 1994 — China
 Singa cyanea (Worley, 1928) — USA
 Singa eugeni Levi, 1972 — USA
 Singa haddooensis Tikader, 1977 — Andaman Islands
 Singa hamata (Clerck, 1757) (type species) — Palearctic
 Singa hilira Barrion & Litsinger, 1995 — Philippines
 Singa kansuensis Schenkel, 1936 — China
 Singa keyserlingi McCook, 1894 — USA, Canada
 Singa lawrencei (Lessert, 1930) — Congo
 Singa leucoplagiata (Simon, 1899) — Sumatra
 Singa lucina (Audouin, 1826) — Mediterranean to Central Asia
 Singa lucina eburnea (Simon, 1929) — Algeria, Tunisia
 Singa myrrhea (Simon, 1895) — India
 Singa neta (O. P.-Cambridge, 1872) — Mediterranean
 Singa nitidula C. L. Koch, 1844 — Palearctic
 Singa perpolita (Thorell, 1892) — Singapore
 Singa semiatra L. Koch, 1867 — Mediterranean, Ukraine
 Singa simoniana Costa, 1885 — Sardinia
 Singa theodori (Thorell, 1894) — Java

Singafrotypa
Singafrotypa Benoit, 1962
 Singafrotypa acanthopus (Simon, 1907) (type species) — Bioko, Ivory Coast, Congo
 Singafrotypa mandela Kuntner & Hormiga, 2002 — South Africa
 Singafrotypa okavango Kuntner & Hormiga, 2002 — Botswana
 Singafrotypa subinermis (Caporiacco, 1940) — Ethiopia

Siwa
Siwa Grasshoff, 1970
 Siwa atomaria (O. P.-Cambridge, 1876) (type species) — Egypt, Israel
 Siwa dufouri (Simon, 1874) — Western Mediterranean

Spilasma
Spilasma Simon, 1897
 Spilasma baptistai Levi, 1995 — Brazil
 Spilasma duodecimguttata (Keyserling, 1879) (type species) — Honduras to Bolivia, Brazil
 Spilasma utaca Levi, 1995 — Peru

Spinepeira
Spinepeira Levi, 1995
 Spinepeira schlingeri Levi, 1995 — Peru

Spintharidius
Spintharidius Simon, 1893
 Spintharidius rhomboidalis Simon, 1893 (type species) — Brazil, Peru, Bolivia, Paraguay
 Spintharidius viridis Franganillo, 1926 — Cuba

Taczanowskia
Taczanowskia Keyserling, 1879
 Taczanowskia gustavoi Ibarra-Núñez, 2013 — Mexico
 Taczanowskia mirabilis Simon, 1897 — Bolivia, Brazil
 Taczanowskia sextuberculata Keyserling, 1892 — Colombia, Brazil
 Taczanowskia striata Keyserling, 1879 (type species) — Peru, Brazil, Argentina
 Taczanowskia trilobata Simon, 1897 — Brazil

Talthybia
Talthybia Thorell, 1898
 Talthybia depressa Thorell, 1898 — China, Myanmar

Tatepeira
Tatepeira Levi, 1995
 Tatepeira carrolli Levi, 1995 — Colombia
 Tatepeira itu Levi, 1995 — Brazil
 Tatepeira stadelmani Levi, 1995 — Honduras
 Tatepeira tatarendensis (Tullgren, 1905) (type species) — Colombia to Bolivia, Bolivia

Telaprocera
Telaprocera Harmer & Framenau, 2008
 Telaprocera joanae Harmer & Framenau, 2008 — Queensland to Victoria
 Telaprocera maudae Harmer & Framenau, 2008 (type species) — Queensland, New South Wales

Testudinaria
Testudinaria Taczanowski, 1879
 Testudinaria bonaldoi Levi, 2005 — Brazil
 Testudinaria debsmithae Levi, 2005 — Suriname to Peru, Bolivia
 Testudinaria elegans Taczanowski, 1879 — Panama to Peru
 Testudinaria geometrica Taczanowski, 1879 (type species) — Panama to Peru, Brazil
 Testudinaria gravatai Levi, 2005 — Brazil
 Testudinaria lemniscata (Simon, 1893) — Brazil
 Testudinaria quadripunctata Taczanowski, 1879 — Venezuela to Peru, Bolivia, Brazil
 Testudinaria rosea (Mello-Leitao, 1945) — Argentina
 Testudinaria unipunctata (Simon, 1893) — Brazil

Thelacantha
Thelacantha Hasselt, 1882
 Thelacantha brevispina (Doleschall, 1857) — Madagascar, India to Philippines, Australia

Thorellina
Thorellina Berg, 1899
 Thorellina acuminata (Thorell, 1898) (type species) — Myanmar
 Thorellina anepsia (Kulczynski, 1911) — New Guinea

Togacantha
Togacantha Dahl, 1914
 Togacantha nordviei (Strand, 1913) — West, Central, East Africa

Umbonata
Umbonata Grasshoff, 1971
 Umbonata spinosissima (Tullgren, 1910) — Tanzania

Ursa
Ursa Simon, 1895
 Ursa flavovittata Simon, 1909 — Vietnam
 Ursa lunula (Nicolet, 1849) — Chile
 Ursa pulchra Simon, 1895 (type species) — Brazil
 Ursa turbinata Simon, 1895 — South Africa
 Ursa vittigera Simon, 1895 — Sri Lanka

Verrucosa 
Verrucosa McCook, 1888
 Verrucosa alvarengai Lise, Kesster & Silva, 2015 -   Brazil 
 Verrucosa apuela Lise, Kesster & Silva, 2015 - Ecuador 
 Verrucosa arenata (Walckenaer, 1841) (type species) — USA to Panama, Greater Antilles
 Verrucosa avilesae Lise, Kesster & Silva, 2015 - Ecuador, Colombia 
 Verrucosa bartica Lise, Kesster & Silva, 2015 - Guyana 
 Verrucosa benavidesae Lise, Kesster & Silva, 2015 -  Colombia, Peru 
 Verrucosa brachiscapa Lise, Kesster & Silva, 2015 -  Ecuador 
 Verrucosa cachimbo Lise, Kesster & Silva, 2015 - Brazil 
 Verrucosa cajamarca Lise, Kesster & Silva, 2015 -  Peru 
 Verrucosa caninde Lise, Kesster & Silva, 2015 -  Brazil 
 Verrucosa canje Lise, Kesster & Silva, 2015 - Guyana 
 Verrucosa carara Lise, Kesster & Silva, 2015 - Costa Rica 
 Verrucosa chanchamayo Lise, Kesster & Silva, 2015 - Peru 
 Verrucosa coroico Lise, Kesster & Silva, 2015 - Bolivia 
 Verrucosa cuyabenoensis Lise, Kesster & Silva, 2015 - Ecuador, Bolivia 
 Verrucosa cuyuni Lise, Kesster & Silva, 2015 -  Guyana 
 Verrucosa cylicophora (Badcock, 1932) -  Brazil, Paraguay 
 Verrucosa excavata Lise, Kesster & Silva, 2015 - Colombia 
 Verrucosa florezi Lise, Kesster & Silva, 2015 - Colombia 
 Verrucosa furcifera (Keyserling, 1886) — Queensland
 Verrucosa galianoae Lise, Kesster & Silva, 2015 - Brazil 
 Verrucosa guatopo Lise, Kesster & Silva, 2015 - Venezuela 
 Verrucosa hoferi Lise, Kesster & Silva, 2015 - Brazil 
 Verrucosa lampra (Soares & Camargo, 1948) -  Brazil 
 Verrucosa lata Lise, Kesster & Silva, 2015 - Brazil 
 Verrucosa latigastra Lise, Kesster & Silva, 2015 - Guyana, Brazil 
 Verrucosa levii Lise, Kesster & Silva, 2015 - Brazil 
 Verrucosa macarena Lise, Kesster & Silva, 2015 - Colombia 
 Verrucosa manauara Lise, Kesster & Silva, 2015 - Brazil 
 Verrucosa meridionalis (Keyserling, 1892) — Brazil, Paraguay
 Verrucosa meta Lise, Kesster & Silva, 2015 -  Colombia 
 Verrucosa opon Lise, Kesster & Silva, 2015 -  Colombia 
 Verrucosa pedrera Lise, Kesster & Silva, 2015 -  Colombia 
 Verrucosa rancho Lise, Kesster & Silva, 2015 - Venezuela 
 Verrucosa reticulata (O. Pickard-Cambridge, 1889) - Panama 
 Verrucosa rhea Lise, Kesster & Silva, 2015 -  Brazil 
 Verrucosa scapofracta Lise, Kesster & Silva, 2015 -   Brazil, Argentina 
 Verrucosa septemmammata Caporiacco, 1954 — French Guiana
 Verrucosa sergipana Lise, Kesster & Silva, 2015 -  Brazil 
 Verrucosa silvae Lise, Kesster & Silva, 2015 -  Colombia, Peru 
 Verrucosa simla Lise, Kesster & Silva, 2015 - Trinidad 
 Verrucosa suaita Lise, Kesster & Silva, 2015 - Colombia 
 Verrucosa tarapoa Lise, Kesster & Silva, 2015 - Ecuador, Colombia, Brazil 
 Verrucosa tuberculata Lise, Kesster & Silva, 2015 -  Colombia 
 Verrucosa undecimvariolata (O. P.-Cambridge, 1889) —  Mexico to Argentina 
 Verrucosa zebra (Keyserling, 1892) — Brazil, Argentina

Wagneriana
Wagneriana F. O. P.-Cambridge, 1904
 Wagneriana acrosomoides (Mello-Leitao, 1939) — Colombia to Brazil
 Wagneriana alma Levi, 1991 — Brazil
 Wagneriana atuna Levi, 1991 — Costa Rica to Paraguay
 Wagneriana bamba Levi, 1991 — Peru
 Wagneriana carimagua Levi, 1991 — Colombia
 Wagneriana carinata F. O. P.-Cambridge, 1904 — Guatemala
 Wagneriana cobella Levi, 1991 — Colombia, Venezuela
 Wagneriana dimastophora (Mello-Leitao, 1940) — Brazil
 Wagneriana eldorado Levi, 1991 — Argentina
 Wagneriana eupalaestra (Mello-Leitao, 1943) — Brazil, Argentina
 Wagneriana fina Alayon, 2011 — Cuba
 Wagneriana gavensis (Camargo, 1950) — Brazil
 Wagneriana grandicornis Mello-Leitao, 1935 — Costa Rica, Brazil
 Wagneriana hassleri Levi, 1991 — Brazil, Guyana
 Wagneriana heteracantha (Mello-Leitao, 1943) — Brazil, Argentina
 Wagneriana huanca Levi, 1991 — Peru
 Wagneriana iguape Levi, 1991 — Brazil, Paraguay
 Wagneriana jacaza Levi, 1991 — Colombia, Brazil
 Wagneriana jelskii (Taczanowski, 1873) — Trinidad to Bolivia
 Wagneriana juquia Levi, 1991 — Brazil, Paraguay, Argentina
 Wagneriana lechuza Levi, 1991 — Peru, Brazil
 Wagneriana levii Pinto-da-Rocha & Buckup, 1995 — Brazil
 Wagneriana madrejon Levi, 1991 — Paraguay
 Wagneriana maseta Levi, 1991 — Colombia to Ecuador and Brazil
 Wagneriana neblina Levi, 1991 — Venezuela
 Wagneriana neglecta (Mello-Leitao, 1939) — Trinidad to Argentina
 Wagneriana pakitza Levi, 1991 — Peru
 Wagneriana roraima Levi, 1991 — Brazil
 Wagneriana silvae Levi, 1991 — Peru, Bolivia
 Wagneriana spicata (O. P.-Cambridge, 1889) — Mexico to Costa Rica
 Wagneriana taboga Levi, 1991 — Panama to Venezuela
 Wagneriana taim Levi, 1991 — Brazil
 Wagneriana tauricornis (O. P.-Cambridge, 1889) (type species) — USA to Peru
 Wagneriana tayos Levi, 1991 — Colombia to Peru
 Wagneriana transitoria (C. L. Koch, 1839) — Venezuela to Argentina
 Wagneriana turrigera Schenkel, 1953 — Venezuela
 Wagneriana undecimtuberculata (Keyserling, 1865) — Panama to Peru
 Wagneriana uropygialis (Mello-Leitao, 1944) — Argentina
 Wagneriana uzaga Levi, 1991 — Brazil, Paraguay, Argentina
 Wagneriana vallenuevo Alayon, 2011 — Hispaniola
 Wagneriana vegas Levi, 1991 — Cuba, Hispaniola
 Wagneriana vermiculata Mello-Leitao, 1949 — Brazil
 Wagneriana yacuma Levi, 1991 — Brazil, Bolivia

Witica
Witica O. P.-Cambridge, 1895
 Witica alobatus (Franganillo, 1931) — Cuba
 Witica cayanus (Taczanowski, 1873) — Northern South America
 Witica crassicaudus (Keyserling, 1865) (type species) — Mexico to Peru

Wixia
Wixia O. P.-Cambridge, 1882
 Wixia abdominalis O. P.-Cambridge, 1882 — Brazil, Guyana, Bolivia

Xylethrus
Xylethrus Simon, 1895
 Xylethrus ameda Levi, 1996 — Brazil
 Xylethrus anomid Levi, 1996 — Peru, Brazil
 Xylethrus arawak Archer, 1965 — Mexico, Jamaica
 Xylethrus perlatus Simon, 1895 — Brazil
 Xylethrus scrupeus Simon, 1895 — Panama to Bolivia, Brazil
 Xylethrus superbus Simon, 1895 (type species) — Colombia, Peru, Bolivia, Paraguay, Brazil

Yaginumia
Yaginumia Archer, 1960
 Yaginumia sia (Strand, 1906) — China, Korea, Taiwan, Japan

Zealaranea
Zealaranea Court & Forster, 1988
 Zealaranea crassa (Walckenaer, 1841) (type species) — New Zealand
 Zealaranea prina Court & Forster, 1988 — New Zealand
 Zealaranea saxitalis (Urquhart, 1887) — New Zealand
 Zealaranea trinotata (Urquhart, 1890) — New Zealand

Zilla
Zilla C. L. Koch, 1834
 Zilla crownia Yin, Xie & Bao, 1996 — China
 Zilla diodia (Walckenaer, 1802) (type species) — Europe to Azerbaijan
 Zilla globosa Saha & Raychaudhuri, 2004 — India
 Zilla qinghaiensis Hu, 2001 — China

Zygiella
Zygiella F. O. P.-Cambridge, 1902
 Zygiella atrica (C. L. Koch, 1845) (type species) — Europe, Russia (USA, Canada, introduced)
 Zygiella calyptrata (Workman & Workman, 1894) — China, Myanmar, Malaysia
 Zygiella carpenteri (Archer, 1951) - USA 
 Zygiella dispar (Kulczyński, 1885) -  Holarctic 
 Zygiella keyserlingi (Ausserer, 1871) — Southern Europe, Ukraine
 Zygiella kirgisica Bakhvalov, 1974 — Kyrgyzstan
 Zygiella minima Schmidt, 1968 — Canary Islands
 Zygiella montana (C. L. Koch, 1834) -  Palearctic 
 Zygiella nearctica Gertsch, 1964 — Alaska, Canada, USA
 Zygiella pulcherrima (Zawadsky, 1902) — Russia
 Zygiella x-notata (Clerck, 1757) — Holarctic, Neotropical

References
  (2014): The world spider catalog, version 17.5. American Museum of Natural History. 

Lists of spider species by family